Kabetsovo is a rural locality (a village) in Kemskoye Rural Settlement, Vytegorsky District, Vologda Oblast, Russia. The population was 8 as of 2002.

Geography 
Kabetsovo is located 84 km southeast of Vytegra (the district's administrative centre) by road. Mirny is the nearest  locality.

References 

Rural localities in Vytegorsky District